The Wearside Football League is a non-league football competition based in northern England. It consists of three divisions which sits at steps 7 to 9 (or levels 11 to 13) of the National League System and is a feeder to the Northern League Division Two.

Founded in 1892, the Wearside League's level has fluctuated in its history, though it has typically sat below the Northern League. The league's high point was probably during the 1960s and 70s after several teams from the defunct North Eastern League joined it; Wearside League teams won the FA Vase in 1978 and 1981. With the restructuring of the National League System in the early 2000s its place at step 7 became fully established, helped by a merger with the Durham Alliance Combination League in 2017. The league has expanded and contracted its number of divisions over the years, and as of 2021-22 consists of three divisions.

Although centred on Wearside and County Durham, the league has contained teams from Tyneside as well, with some geographical overlap with the Northern Football Alliance at the leagues' borders. Teams from Northern Cumbria and North Yorkshire also compete in the league. The league also operates three cup competitions: the Monkwearmouth Charity Cup and the Shipowners' Charity Cup, both of which have been contested since the 1890s, and the League Challenge Cup, which came into being in the 1930s.

History
The Wearside League came into being in 1892 at the instigation of Charles Kirtley, secretary of Sunderland Swifts.  In June 1892, a letter written by Kirtley was published in the Sunderland Daily Post and The Herald in which he stated that he had been asked by several club secretaries about the possibility of forming an organisation to play home-and-home matches, so as to find out which was the best amateur team. A similar letter was published in the Sunderland Daily Echo. At a meeting soon afterwards at the Central Coffee Tavern, eleven clubs agreed to form a league, which commenced playing later that year.

During the early years of the league most teams were extremely hard-up, and the league's archive records that one early club had no pitch but instead played on the sands by Sunderland Docks, and another had to play with an old rugby ball as they could not afford an association football ball.  By the 20th century, however, the league was better off and was even able to organise matches to benefit local charities during World War I.  After the Great War, the league was dominated for many years by colliery welfare teams – in the 1930s every league title was won by a pit team and the mining clubs continued to dominate right through to the 1970s, although an increasing number began to experience financial difficulties from the 1950s onwards due to shrinking workforces at the mines.

In 1964 the North Eastern League was disbanded and a number of its former teams joined the Wearside League.  Around this time the team of the 24th Signal Regiment spent one season in the league but then had to withdraw as most of their players were posted overseas.  In 1978 Blue Star became the first Wearside League club to reach the final of the FA Vase, and went on to win the trophy, the start of a run of success which would ultimately see them progress much higher up the non-league ranks.  Three years later Whickham repeated the feat and also soon moved up to higher leagues. More recently, clubs such as Darlington Railway Athletic, North Shields, Newton Aycliffe, Ryhope Colliery Welfare and Willington have successfully moved up to the Northern League.

Member clubs for 2022–23 season
First Division
Annfield Plain
Darlington Railway Athletic
Darlington Town
Durham City
Durham Corinthians
Durham United
Farrington Detached
FC Hartlepool
Gateshead Leam Rangers
Norton And Stockton Ancients Youth
Richmond Town
Shildon AFC Reserves
Shotton Colliery
Silksworth Colliery Welfare
South Moor 
Windscale 
Wolviston 

Second Division
Belmont United
Billingham Town Reserves
Birtley Town Development
Bishop Auckland  Reserves
Coxhoe Athletic 
Feryhill Athletic 
Hartlepool Pools Youth  Seniors
Hetton Town 
Hylton Colliery Welfare
Polton 
Wearmouth CW 
West Auckland Tunns
Wynard Village

Third Division
Barnard Castle 
Billingham Synthonia Reserves
Chester Le Street United Reserves
Consett Reserves
Deerness Valley 
Gateshead Leam Rangers Reserves
Hilda Park 
New Durham AFC
Roseberry Park 
Sunderland RCA Reserves 
Wear United
Wynard Village Reserves

Past champions
This is a list of champions since World War II.

References

External links
Official League site

 
1892 establishments in England
Football leagues in England
Sports leagues established in 1892
Football in County Durham
Football in Tyne and Wear